Oleksandr Kasyan (born 27 January 1989) is a Ukrainian professional footballer who plays in Uzbekistan for FC AGMK.

Career
He has been called up to the Ukraine national under-21 football team. He also holds Russian citizenship as Aleksandr Yuryevich Kasyan.

On 8 January 2019, he joined Uzbek club Navbahor Namangan.

References

External links

1989 births
Living people
Association football forwards
Ukrainian people of Armenian descent
Russian people of Armenian descent
Ukrainian footballers
Ukraine youth international footballers
Ukraine under-21 international footballers
Ukrainian expatriate footballers
Expatriate footballers in Russia
Ukrainian expatriate sportspeople in Russia
FC Mariupol players
FC Zorya Luhansk players
FC Karpaty Lviv players
Ukrainian Premier League players
FC Tom Tomsk players
FC Fakel Voronezh players
FC Baltika Kaliningrad players
Navbahor Namangan players
Russian Premier League players
Expatriate footballers in Uzbekistan
FC Avangard Kursk players
FC Khimik Dzerzhinsk players
Surkhon Termez players
FC AGMK players
Uzbekistan Super League players
Ukrainian expatriate sportspeople in Uzbekistan
Sportspeople from Donetsk Oblast